Kate Gardiner (21 September 1885–29 January 1974) was a New Zealand mountaineer. She was born in Wavertree, Liverpool, Lancashire, England on 21 September 1885. She was the daughter of Frederick Gardiner who made the first ascent of Mount Elbrus.
 
In 1930 she made first ascents with her guide Walter Feuz in the Canadian Rockies of Mount Lyautey, Mount Sarrail, Mount Foch, Mount Bogart, Warrior Mountain, and Mount Galatea. Other notable first ascents include Mount Prince Henry (1919), Mount Alcantara (1929), Foster Peak (1933), and White Pyramid (1939). She would eventually complete 33 first ascents in the Canadian Rockies.

References

External links
History of Gardiner Hut

1885 births
1974 deaths
New Zealand mountain climbers
People from Wavertree
Female climbers
British emigrants to New Zealand